Gordon Bryan (born 1992) is a Jamaican cricketer. He made his List A debut for Jamaica in the 2018–19 Regional Super50 tournament on 4 October 2018. He made his first-class debut for Jamaica in the 2018–19 Regional Four Day Competition on 28 February 2019.

References

External links
 

1992 births
Living people
Jamaica cricketers
Jamaican cricketers
Place of birth missing (living people)